The fifteenth season of Saturday Night Live, an American sketch comedy series, originally aired in the United States on NBC between September 30, 1989 and May 19, 1990.

This season saw the first appearances of three frequent SNL hosts: John Goodman, who auditioned to be a cast member on SNL during the 1980–81 season and frequently appeared on SNL in the mid-1990s as Linda Tripp; Christopher Walken, whose sketch   "The Continental" had been a staple in six of the seven episodes hosted by Walken; and Alec Baldwin (who later surpassed Steve Martin as the most frequent SNL host). 

A live special commemorating fifteen seasons of SNL was aired September 24, 1989, before the start of the season.

Cast
Very few changes were made before and during this season. Mike Myers was upgraded to repertory status mid-season. This was the final season for Nora Dunn and Jon Lovitz.

Cast roster

Repertory players
Dana Carvey
Nora Dunn
Phil Hartman
Jan Hooks
Victoria Jackson
Jon Lovitz
Dennis Miller
Mike Myers (upgraded to repertory status: February 17, 1990)
Kevin Nealon

Featured players
A. Whitney Brown
Al Franken

bold denotes Weekend Update anchor

Writers

Episodes

Special

References

15
Saturday Night Live in the 1980s
Saturday Night Live in the 1990s
1989 American television seasons
1990 American television seasons